The West Hickory Bridge is a girder bridge that carries Pennsylvania Route 127 across the Allegheny River in rural Forest County, Pennsylvania. Spanning the river between Harmony Township and Hickory Township, it is named for the village of West Hickory.

This 2007 bridge replaced an 1896 one-lane truss bridge, which was designed for non-motorized traffic. It was a multiple span, Pratt truss bridge built by the Groton Bridge Company and measured 695 feet, 6 inches, in length. The old bridge was added to the National Register of Historic Places in 1988. Despite the low use of the bridge (only about 900 drivers per day), it was considered to be in need of replacement.

See also
List of crossings of the Allegheny River

References

Bridge Mapper article on old structure

Bridges over the Allegheny River
Bridges completed in 2007
Road bridges on the National Register of Historic Places in Pennsylvania
National Register of Historic Places in Forest County, Pennsylvania
Girder bridges in the United States
Pratt truss bridges in the United States
Metal bridges in the United States
Transportation buildings and structures in Forest County, Pennsylvania